Thomas Amoako Boafo, known as Amoako Boafo (born 10 May 1984), is a Ghanaian painter and visual artist.

Early life and education
Boafo was born and raised in Osu, in the Greater Accra Region of Ghana. He attended the Ghanatta College of Art and Design in Accra, and later continued his education at the Academy of Fine Arts Vienna in Austria.

Career
Boafo's portraits focus on posture, clothing, and the stroke of skin which he accentuates with the finger painting technique.

In 2019, Boafo participated in a residency at the new Rubell Museum in Miami, Florida, and in 2020 collaborated with Dior for their Spring/Summer 2021 Men Collection.

His work Suborbital Tryptych, consisting of three portraits of himself, his mother, and a friend's mother, was printed on the top of the crew capsule of a New Shepard rocket that performed an unmanned suborbital launch on August 26th, 2021 reaching outer space with an apogee of 106 km. On 26 May 2022, his debut U.S. exhibit, Soul of Black Folks, opened at Contemporary Art Museum Houston.

Collections
Boafo's work is in private and public collections, most recently in the Blenheim Art Foundation, Los Angeles County Museum of Art, Solomon R. Guggenheim Museum, Rubell Museum, Marieluise Hessel Collection, the  Aishti Foundation, the CCS Bard College Hessel Museum of Art, the  Pizzuti Collection of Columbus Museum of Art and the  Albertina Museum in Vienna.

Recognition
 2017 – Jury prize, Walter Koschatzky Art Prize
 2019 – STRABAG Art award International

Art market
Boafo is represented by Mariane Ibrahim Gallery in Chicago and Roberts Projects in Los Angeles. In 2021, his Hands Up (2018) sold for HKD 26.7 million ($3.4 million) at Christie’s in Hong Kong.

References

Living people
1984 births
Male painters
21st-century Ghanaian painters
Ghanaian male artists
21st-century male artists
People from Greater Accra Region

External Links 
Amoako Boafo at Roberts Projects, Los Angeles, CA